The Shire of Belfast was a local government area about  west-southwest of Melbourne, the state capital of Victoria, Australia.

History

Belfast was first incorporated as a road district on 29 June 1853, and became a shire on 8 December 1863.

On 23 September 1994, the Shire of Belfast was abolished, and along with the Borough of Port Fairy, the Shires of Minhamite and Mortlake, and parts of the Shires of Dundas, Mount Rouse, Warrnambool and the Tower Hill State Game Reserve, was merged into the newly created Shire of Moyne.

Wards

The Shire of Belfast was divided into three ridings, each of which elected three councillors:
 Kirkstall Riding
 Moyne Riding
 Yambuk Riding

Towns and localities
 Codrington
 Crossley
 Killarney
 Kirkstall
 Rosebrook
 St Helens
 Toolong
 Tyrendarra East
 Yambuk

Population

* Estimate in the 1958 Victorian Year Book.

References

External links
 Victorian Places - Belfast Shire

Belfast